The men's moguls at the 2003 Asian Winter Games was held on 6 February 2003 at Ajigasawa Ski Area, Japan.

Schedule
All times are Japan Standard Time (UTC+09:00)

Results
Legend
DNS — Did not start

Final

References

Results

External links
Schedule

Men's moguls